The Macaé Youth Cup (Portuguese: Copa Macaé de Juvenis) was an under-17 football cup formed by Brazilian and international teams. The competition was organized by the Macaense Sporting League (Liga Macaense de Desportos) in association with the Rio de Janeiro Football Federation, and it ran from 1997 until 2009.

Format 
The competition format changed almost every year. Normally, the clubs were divided in several groups of four or five teams, and the two best placed clubs of each groups qualify to the knockout stage.

All matches were usually played in July, in Macaé and other countryside Rio de Janeiro state cities, like Barra do Macaé, Campos dos Goytacazes, Carapebus, Córrego do Ouro, and Quissamã.

Invited clubs 
Usually traditional Brazilian clubs were invited, like Atlético Mineiro, Atlético Paranaense, Bahia, Botafogo, Corinthians, Coritiba, Cruzeiro, Flamengo, Fluminense, Grêmio, Internacional, and Vasco da Gama.

Among the non-Brazilian clubs which had disputed the competition, were América, Toluca and UNAM Pumas of Mexico, Pohang Iron and Steel Company (Posco) of South Korea and Shanghai Shenhua of China.

List of champions

Titles by club

Titles by state and country

External links 
  Official website
 RSSSF
 2005 competition at Rio de Janeiro Football Federation website
 2006 competition at Rio de Janeiro Football Federation website

Defunct football cup competitions in Brazil
Youth football competitions in Brazil
Macae de Juvenis
Under-17 association football